The brown-chested martin (Progne tapera) is a species of passerine bird in the swallow family.

It is found in Argentina, Bolivia, Brazil, Chile, Colombia, Costa Rica, Ecuador, French Guiana, Guyana, Panama, Paraguay, Peru, Puerto Rico, Suriname, the United States, Uruguay, Venezuela, and is a vagrant to Chile and the Falkland Islands. Its natural habitats are dry savanna, subtropical or tropical seasonally wet or flooded lowland grassland, rivers, and heavily degraded former forest.

It usually swoops at low heights, showing white on the sides of its tail, with wings bowed. It may dig burrows into banks to nest (or occasionally in snags) or sometimes use old hornero nests.

References

brown-chested martin
Birds of Colombia
Birds of Venezuela
Birds of Ecuador
Birds of the Guianas
Birds of Argentina
Birds of Bolivia
Birds of Brazil
Birds of Paraguay
Birds of Uruguay
brown-chested martin
brown-chested martin
Taxonomy articles created by Polbot